Polypoetes aterrima is a moth classified under the family Notodontidae. It is found in Colombia.

References

Moths described in 1913
Notodontidae of South America